The following is the official canvassing of votes by the Congress of the Philippines for the 1961 Philippine presidential election. The canvassing started on December 12, 1961, and ended on December 13, 1961.

Joint Committee 
The following are the members of the joint committee of the both houses of Congress which canvassed the returns for the presidential and vice presidential elections.

Presidential election

Vice presidential election

References 

1961 in the Philippines